Crisia acuta is an extinct species of marine bryozoan within the family Crisiidae. It lived in the Paleogene period in southeastern Australia, with the locality being from Cape Otway. The species is distinguished by the convexity and smoothness of the zoarium in its front surface.

References 

Fossil taxa described in 1908
Extinct bryozoans
Cyclostomatida
Paleogene first appearances
Paleogene extinctions
Paleogene animals of Australia